The Associated Canadian Theological Schools (ACTS Seminaries) is an interdenominational consortium of evangelical Christian seminaries in Canada, embedded as a graduate schools of theology within Trinity Western University. Together, the consortium jointly grants master's and doctoral degrees in biblical studies, theology, ministry, linguistics, chaplaincy and marriage and family therapy. ACTS Seminaries is an accredited member of the Association of Theological Schools.

History
ACTS Seminaries was founded in 1985 by Canadian Baptist Seminary, Northwest Baptist Seminary and Trinity Western University, with the dual mission of providing excellent graduate theological education for students within a Christian university setting, and serving as a place to educate and train leaders for churches. The consortium operated on the TWU campus, allowing the other members to consolidate their previous physical locations. Mennonite Brethren Biblical Seminary joined ACTS Seminaries in 1999.

Member institutions
The four member schools of ACTS Seminaries are Canadian Baptist Seminary, Mennonite Brethren Biblical Seminary, Northwest Baptist Seminary and Trinity Western University. Alongside the member seminaries, Canada Institute of Linguistics and the Vancouver Institute for Evangelical Worldview work in affiliation with ACTS Seminaries to provide specialized degree programs. Within ACTS Seminaries and Trinity Western University, The John William Wevers Institute for Septuagint Studies is a research institute that serves as a hub for Septuagint research, translation, and publication projects.

References

External links
Associated Canadian Theological Schools official website

Seminaries and theological colleges in Canada
College and university associations and consortia in Canada